Fuel dyes are dyes added to fuels, as in some countries it is required by law to dye a low-tax fuel to deter its use in applications intended for higher-taxed ones. Untaxed fuels are referred to as "dyed", while taxed ones are called "clear" or "white".

Aviation gasoline is dyed, both for tax reasons (avgas is typically taxed to support aviation infrastructure) as well as safety (due to the consequences of fuelling an aircraft with the wrong kind of fuel).

Types of dyes 
The dyes used have to be soluble in the fuels they are added to and therefore in hydrocarbon-based nonpolar solvents ("solvent dyes"). Red dyes are often various diazo dyes, e.g., Solvent Red 19, Solvent Red 24, and Solvent Red 26. Anthraquinone dyes are used for green and blue shades, e.g., Solvent Green 33, Solvent Blue 35 and Solvent Blue 26.

The pure dyes found in modern liquid petroleum dyes are longer alkyl side chain forms of traditional dyes and normally multiple chain length variations of the chromophore are found within a typical commercial liquid petroleum dye.
For instance, Sudan Red 462 is a form of Solvent Red 19, with the ethyl side chain replaced by either a 2-ethylhexyl or a tridecyl side chain. The longer branched side chains improve solubility dramatically, but in some cases the high solubility prevents the dye being isolated as a crystal, except at very low temperatures.
The high-solubility liquid dyes originated with Morton International and BASF (ACNA Italy) as the primary inventors.
For instance, Morton International created Solvent Blue 98 as a high solubility form of Solvent Blue 35. BASF created Solvent Blue 79 as its high solubility form of Solvent Blue 35.
In some cases it is possible, with normal solvents—e.g., xylene—to prepare stable (to -20C) solutions at 65% "solids" content. The original powder dye form of the chromophore would not be soluble beyond 2% in xylene.

Only a few refineries worldwide still use powder dyes for colouring fuels, as although they are lower cost per active molecule of dye chromophore than the modified forms, they have significant handling issues and health and safety issues that inherently arise from the handling of azo dyes (reds/yellows/green mixes). It is advantageous to mix a liquid with a liquid instead of handling powdered dyes into a liquid.

Fuel dye in the European Union

This dye can be easily hydrolyzed with acids, splitting off the acetal group responsible for its solubility in nonpolar solvents, and yielding a water-soluble form. Like a similar methyl orange dye, it changes color to red in acidic pH. It can be easily detected in the fuel at levels as low as 0.3 ppm by extraction to a diluted hydrochloric acid, allowing detection of the red diesel added into motor diesel in amounts as low as 2–3%.
The European Union has announced that a new and better marker has been found to replace Solvent Yellow 124. On 14th February 2022 the EU Commission published their decision dated 17th January 2022 naming the new marker as "ACCUTRACE(TM) Plus" ButoxyBenzene with a transition date ending 18 January 2024

United Kingdom

In the United Kingdom, "red diesel" is dyed gas oil for registered agricultural or construction vehicles such as tractors, excavators, cranes and some other non-road applications such as boats. Red diesel carries a significantly reduced tax levy compared to un-dyed diesel fuel used in ordinary road vehicles. As red diesel is widely available in the UK, the authorities regularly carry out roadside checks. Unauthorised use incurs heavy fines but despite this, spot checks have occasionally found as many as one in five motorists using red diesel.

Red diesel can also be used in road vehicles which are registered as off road with the DVLA provided they are only used on private land. On 14 July 2014, the European Commission announced it was referring the United Kingdom to the European Court of Justice over the use of red diesel in propelling private pleasure craft on water. It believed the UK was not properly applying EU regulations for the fiscal marking of fuels.

On 18 November 2014, a new measure to combat fuel laundering was set to result in the illegal trade being "virtually eliminated" in the United Kingdom, according to HM Revenue and Customs. A new dye was introduced in April 2015 in the United Kingdom and the Republic of Ireland.

Carbon offset red diesel
Carbon offset red diesel is, as of 2014, available in the UK. It is marketed as an environmentally friendly alternative to regular red diesel.  There is an extra cost incurred when purchasing carbon offset red diesel; however, some suppliers of the fuel are donating the extra cost to projects aimed at lowering carbon emissions, meaning they make no extra profit from the sale of the fuel.

Finland 

Low-tax dyed fuel oil (always abbreviated on nozzles as MPÖ) is available in many rural petrol stations in Finland, primarily intended for certain types of non-road vehicles such as tractors and driveable construction vehicles. Until 2002, furfural was used to dye fuel oil in Finland, when it was replaced with Solvent Yellow 124. Since 2008, boats and pleasure craft are no longer legally allowed to use low-tax fuel oil; instead, taxable diesel must be used for fuel.

Poland 
Currently there are no naked-eye visible dyes in car fuels sold in Poland. Previously, during the time of Communist Party rule, the state-owned CPN fuel monopoly dyed leaded gasolines (marketed as "ethilins") in the following colors: 78 – blue, 86 – green, 94 – yellow, 98 – red. Diesel fuel, although unleaded, was also dyed a brown color.

Fuel dye in North America
In the United States of America, the Environmental Protection Agency mandates use of a red dye to identify fuels for off-road use. Solvent Red 26 is used in the United States as a standard, though it is often replaced with Solvent Red 164, which is similar to Solvent Red 26 but with longer alkyl chains. The Internal Revenue Service regulation  mandates use of the same red dyes, in fivefold concentration, for tax-exempt diesel fuels such as heating oil; their argument for the higher dye content is to allow detection even when diluted with "legal" fuel. Detection of red-dyed fuel in the fuel system of an on-road vehicle will incur substantial penalties.

Fuel laundering

Organised crime gangs may "launder" low-price dyed fuel, removing the dye and selling it illegally to unsuspecting motorists at the higher price of undyed fuel. Paramilitary groups connected to political unrest in Northern Ireland have established laundering plants on both sides of the Irish border. In 2009, customs officials shut down a plant capable of removing the dye from  6.5 million litres of fuel per year. In 2011, a plant capable of processing 30 million litres was discovered.

Fuel theft
Fuel is being dyed by companies such as Bord na Móna in Ireland in an effort to combat the widespread theft of fuel.

Dyes used by country
Some dyes required in some countries are listed here:

References

External links
 Minnesota State Patrol Commercial Vehicle Enforcement Dyed Fuel Program
 Shell information on aviation gasoline specifications
 Crown Oil fuel dye information